Filip Krajinović won the inaugural tournament by defeating Federico Gaio 2–6, 7–6(7–5), 7–5

Seeds

Draw

Finals

Top half

Bottom half

References 
 Main Draw
 Qualifying Draw

International Tennis Tournament of Cortina - Men's Singles
2014 Men's Singles